Nicole J. Arendt (born August 26, 1969) is an American retired professional tennis player. Arendt won sixteen doubles titles in her career. The left-hander reached her highest singles ranking on the WTA Tour on June 16, 1997, when she was ranked 49th in the world. Arendt reached her career-high doubles ranking of No. 3 in the world on August 25, 1997.

Arendt was born in Somerville, New Jersey. She attended the Hun School of Princeton for her high school education.

Arendt received an athletic scholarship to attend the University of Florida in Gainesville, Florida, where she played for coach Andy Brandi's Florida Gators women's tennis team in National Collegiate Athletic Association (NCAA) competition from 1988 to 1991. She was a key member of the Gators' NCAA national championship runners-up teams in 1988 and 1990, and received eight All-American honors during her college career.

She turned professional in 1991. Arendt's best Grand Slam doubles result was reaching the finals of the 1997 Wimbledon Championships, partnering with Manon Bollegraf. She and her mixed doubles partner Luke Jensen were the runners-up in the 1996 Australian Open and 1996 French Open. Her highest world doubles ranking was No. 3 on August 25, 1997.

Arendt was inducted into the University of Florida Athletic Hall of Fame in 2001; she graduated from the university with a bachelor's degree in public relations in 2003.

Grand Slam finals

Women's doubles: 1 runner-up

Mixed doubles: 2 runner-ups

WTA career finals

Doubles titles: 16

Doubles runner-ups: 16

Performance timeline

Doubles

See also

Florida Gators
List of Florida Gators tennis players
List of University of Florida alumni
List of University of Florida Athletic Hall of Fame members

References

External links
 
 

1969 births
Living people
Sportspeople from Somerville, New Jersey
American female tennis players
Florida Gators women's tennis players
Hun School of Princeton alumni
Sportspeople from Gainesville, Florida
Tennis people from Florida
Tennis people from New Jersey